Jamie Jack (born 8 September 1996) is an English rugby union player, currently playing for United Rugby Championship side Edinburgh Rugby. His preferred position is prop.

Career
He joined  in 2020, before moving to  during the latter part of the 2021–22 United Rugby Championship.

References

External links
itsrugby profile

Living people
English rugby union players
Nottingham R.F.C. players
Ampthill RUFC players
Edinburgh Rugby players
Rugby union props
1996 births
London Irish players